Joaquim Passarinho Pinto de Souza Porto (born 2 December 1961) is a Brazilian politician and architect. Born in Belém, he has served in the state council,  as well as state representative since 2015 for Pará.

Personal life
Passarinho studied architecture at university. He is a practicing Roman Catholic. He is the nephew of former senator and governor of Pará, Jarbas Passarinho.

Political career
Passarinho served on the city council of Belém, as well as serving in the state senate and having two separate stints of being Secretary of State for Public Works for the state of Pará, prior to being elected federal deputy.

Passarinho voted in favor of the impeachment against then-president Dilma Rousseff and political reformation. He would vote in favor of a similar corruption investigation into Rousseff's successor Michel Temer. Passarinho voted in favor of the 2017 Brazil labor reform.

References

1961 births
Living people
People from Belém
Brazilian Roman Catholics
Social Democratic Party (Brazil, 2011) politicians
Members of the Chamber of Deputies (Brazil) from Pará
Members of the Legislative Assembly of Pará
Brazilian architects